is a 1999 Japanese drama film directed by Jun Ichikawa and starring Chizuru Ikewaki, Kōsuke Minamino, Kenji Sawada and Yūko Tanaka. It was released on 27 March 1999.

Cast
Chizuru Ikewaki
Kōsuke Minamino
Kenji Sawada
Yūko Tanaka

Reception
It was chosen as the 6th best film at the 21st Yokohama Film Festival.

References

External links

1999 drama films
1999 films
Films directed by Jun Ichikawa
Japanese drama films
1990s Japanese films